Pellenes peninsularis is a jumping spider species in the genus Pellenes.

Description
The spider is small and dark, although some from the west are light brown, rust or tan coloured. The female has light paps and light chevrons on its abdomen, while the male has a line down the centre.

Synonym
Maddison declared that Pellenes wrighti Lowrie & Gertsch, 1955 is a synonym of this species in 2017. A lapsed synonym is Pellenes peninsulanus Roewer, 1954.

Distribution
The species has been found in Canada and the United States of America.

References

Salticidae
Spiders of Canada
Spiders of the United States
Spiders described in 1925